
Gmina Książ Wielki is a rural gmina (administrative district) in Miechów County, Lesser Poland Voivodeship, in southern Poland.

Villages
Gmina Książ Wielki contains the villages and settlements of Antolka, Boczkowice, Cisia Wola, Cisie, Częstoszowice, Giebułtów, Głogowiany, Konaszówka, Krzeszówka, Książ Mały, Książ Mały-Kolonia, Książ Wielki, Łazy, Małoszów, Mianocice, Moczydło, Rzędowice, Stara Wieś, Tochołów, Trzonów, Wielka Wieś, Wrzosy and Zaryszyn.

Neighbouring gminas
Gmina Książ Wielki is bordered by the gminas of Charsznica, Działoszyce, Kozłów, Miechów, Słaboszów and Wodzisław.

References
 Polish official population figures 2006

Ksiaz Wielki
Miechów County